A  is a Japanese superhero who is created to represent a particular region of Japan, such as a prefecture or city. They often perform in special martial arts stage shows. Created either by local groups or the local government, a local hero is modeled after the superheroes of Japanese tokusatsu. A local hero is often themed around the city or prefecture's local mythologies or industries, are created to teach the children who watch the stage shows certain things (like  of Fukui, Fukui Prefecture), or are themed after the event that they are used to promote (the  group performed at the Tokyo Motor Show to act in both the latter forms for road traffic safety).

Although local heroes are produced to act in a local area, some gain fame throughout Japan by performing at other local heroes' shows or being featured in mainstream media.  from Nikaho, Akita Prefecture, has had two theme songs recorded by anison recording artist Ichirou Mizuki (the first of which was previously available on the Japanese iTunes Store) and a subsequent EP featuring Mitsuko Horie's vocals.  from Okinawa Prefecture was featured in his own syndicated television series.  from Tōno, Iwate Prefecture, was featured in an episode of the TBS program Kizuna Dining when they visited Tōno and appears at hero shows throughout Japan. The Marimokkori of Hokkaidō has become a popular character throughout Japan, sold as mobile phone charms, claw machine prizes, among other merchandise.

Independent film releases also use the "local hero" motif to present their characters.  is portrayed as a local hero for Tokyo, and is portrayed by Kazuyoshi Sakai of Hyakujuu Sentai Gaoranger. Anison artist Takayuki Miyauchi performs the second film's theme song.  is a series of DVDs that feature the heroes (Zan Saber, Zan Dagger, Zan Axe) as local heroes of Osaka, starring Ryunosuke Kawai of Tenimyu fame as the lead character.

The anime Tentai Senshi Sunred is based on the local hero theme, featuring the title character as the protector of the city of Kawasaki in Kanagawa Prefecture.

Another TV tokusatsu series, Houjin Yatsurugi was shown as the local hero in Chiba.

Hironobu Kageyama has recorded a song for Norton Fighter as well titled . As a local hero, Norton Fighter is based in the Akihabara region of Tokyo.

During 2020, a new Local Hero series premiered: Dogengers, a show starring a group of Local Heroes from Fukuoka which comprises their leader: Ohgaman, representative of the Ohga Pharmacies, Kitakyuman (Stylized as KitaQMan), who represents Kitakyushu (stylized as KitaQChu), Yamashiron, who stands for the Yamashiro Gas Company, El Brave, who appears to be the Local Hero that represents New Japan Pro Wrestling, and Fukuokalibur, the Local Hero that represents Fukuoka's silk artisans. These five heroes are joined by a new Ohgaman (dubbed "Ohgaman Rookie", or "Rookie", for short) as they fight Yabai Mask and the Secret Society of Darkness, Incorporated, a villain-distributing corporation. The first season was so successful, a second one was made, with mixed reception.

See also 

 Yuru-chara

References

See also
Category:Local hero at the Japanese Wikipedia

Japanese superheroes
Tokusatsu
Superhero fiction themes